Megan Kealy (born 2000) is a British trampoline gymnast.

Career
Kealy competed at the 2019 Trampoline Gymnastics World Championships where she won a gold medal tumbling team event and a bronze medal in the individual competition. 

She competed at the 2021 World Championships where she won a bronze medal in the tumbling team event and a gold medal in the individual tumbling competition.

She competed at the 2022 Trampoline Gymnastics World Championships where she won a gold medal in the tumbling team and the all-around team events.

References

2000 births
Living people
British female trampolinists
Medalists at the Trampoline Gymnastics World Championships
21st-century British women